Aravaipa Canyon Wilderness is a  wilderness area located in the U.S. State of Arizona.

Access
Pedestrian access to the preserve is allowed only with prior authorization from preserve staff. The area is popular for its recreation, especially its hiking trails and off-roading. Visitors can hike to the abandoned cabin at the Parsons Grove site in the Aravaipa Canyon Preserve as of 2013. Travel in the canyon requires wading in Aravaipa Creek.

Geography
The Aravaipa Canyon Wilderness forms the northwest border of the Galiuro Mountain range. The Nature Conservancy's Aravaipa Canyon Preserve protects 7,000 acres (28 km2) of private land and is contiguous with the BLM wilderness area.

Permits and fees
A permit and fee are required to enter Aravaipa Canyon Wilderness.  Use is limited to 50 people per day. Permits can be obtained from the BLM.

See also
 Galiuro Wilderness
 List of Arizona Wilderness Areas
 Native Fishes of Aravaipa Canyon

References

Sources and external links
 BLM Aravaipa Canyon Wilderness page
 Nature Conservancy Aravaipa Canyon Preserve
 Wilderness.net Aravaipa Canyon Wilderness page

Wilderness areas of Arizona
Canyons and gorges of Arizona
Protected areas of Graham County, Arizona
Protected areas of Pinal County, Arizona
Landforms of Graham County, Arizona
Landforms of Pinal County, Arizona
Bureau of Land Management areas in Arizona
Protected areas established in 1984